Leandro Ângelo Martins (born April 26, 1982), known as Leandro Tatu, is a Brazilian striker.

Club career

Steaua București

2011-12 season
Tatu started the season well, scoring the opening goal in the 36th minute against Voința. The match ended 1-1. He then scored a goal against Mioveni in a 4–0 win. He made a string of 90 minute appearances before playing no Liga I games in November only one game in December. He resumed his starting appearance in March. His next goal did not come until April 2012, where he scored against Oțelul. He made 28 appearances for Steaua overall in the season in the domestic league. He helped the team to a 3rd-place finish in the Liga I which meant they qualified for the Europa League, although they were eliminated in the 7th round of the Cupa României.

2012-13 season
In September 2012 his contract with Steaua was terminated, as the team did not want to pay his high salary.

Return to Steaua
After he ended his contract with Steaua in September 2012, Tatu returned to Steaua București 4 months later, in January 2013.
At the end of the first part of the 2013–14 season, Tatu was released from Steaua again.

Honours
Steaua București
Liga I: 2012–13
Romanian Supercup: 2013

Brazil U-17
FIFA U-17 World Cup: 1999

References

External links 
 

1982 births
Living people
Brazilian footballers
Brazilian expatriate footballers
Sport Club Internacional players
Associação Naval 1º de Maio players
Leixões S.C. players
F.C. Paços de Ferreira players
C.D. Aves players
C.D. Santa Clara players
S.C. Beira-Mar players
FC Steaua București players
Leandro Tatu
Primeira Liga players
Liga I players
Leandro Tatu
Expatriate footballers in Portugal
Expatriate footballers in Romania
Expatriate footballers in Thailand
Association football forwards
Brazilian expatriate sportspeople in Thailand